Anthony Mwinkaara Sumah (born 17 January 1982) is a Ghanaian politician and member of the National Democratic Congress. He is the member of parliament for the Nadowli Kaleo Constituency, Upper West Region

Early life and education 
Mwinkaara hails from Charikpong in the Upper West Region of Ghana. He attended St. Anthony's primary school and proceeded to Tuolu Senior High School. He later gained admission to the University of Ghana, Legon, where he graduated with Bachelor of Science Degree in Health service administration.

References 

Living people
National Democratic Congress (Ghana) politicians
Ghanaian MPs 2021–2025
People from Upper West Region
University of Ghana alumni
1982 births